Wroxton is an unincorporated community in Saskatchewan, located 41 km east of Yorkton, 42 km west of Roblin, Manitoba, and 40 km south of Kamsack at the intersection of Highway 8 and Highway 10.

It is the seat of the rural municipality Calder No. 241 in the Census Division 9.

History 

Wroxton is home to the Ukrainian Orthodox Church of St. Elia, a cultural heritage site of Canada, number 3591 in the Canadian Register of Historic Places.

A post office was opened in Wroxton in 1911. It was named for Wroxton in Oxfordshire, England.

Demographics 
The RM of Calder No. 241 had a population of 322 people in the Canada Census of 2011, which was a decline of 23.9% since 2006. The RM of Calder is governed by a Reeve and 5 councillors.

References 

Calder No. 241, Saskatchewan
Former villages in Saskatchewan
Unincorporated communities in Saskatchewan
Division No. 9, Saskatchewan